La Cour is a French-language surname meaning "the court". People with this surname include:
Ask la Cour, Danish ballet dancer
Emil La Cour (born 1991), Danish footballer
Janus la Cour (1837–1909), Danish painter
Lise la Cour (1944–2016), Danish ballerina 
Poul la Cour (1846–1908), Danish scientist
Niels la Cour (born 1944), Danish composer
Nina LaCour, American author

See also
De la Cour, a similar surname

French-language surnames